Wilson de Freitas (8 October 1910 – 25 March 1945) was a Brazilian rower. He competed in the men's coxed four at the 1936 Summer Olympics.

References

1910 births
1945 deaths
Brazilian male rowers
Olympic rowers of Brazil
Rowers at the 1936 Summer Olympics
Place of birth missing